"We Are Golden" is the first single from English singer Mika's second studio album, The Boy Who Knew Too Much. The song was produced and mixed by Greg Wells and features the gospel choir of Andraé Crouch.

Release
The single made its radio airplay debut in the United Kingdom on 20 July 2009, on BBC Radio 2. It was made available for download on 14 August 2009 in Australia and later on 6 September 2009 in the United Kingdom. It was released physically on 7 September 2009 along with the limited edition 7" and 12" gramophone records. In the United States, "We Are Golden" became available exclusively from Apple's iTunes Store for one week starting 18 August 2009.

Description
In an interview with Q magazine, Mika says:

Critical reception

The song has received mixed and generally positive reviews.

Music video

The music video for "We Are Golden" was shot on 9 July 2009 and 10 July 2009 in Elstree Studios. It was directed by the Swedish film director Jonas Åkerlund. The video premiered on 4 August 2009 in the United Kingdom on Channel 4. The video features Mika dancing around a bedroom in his underwear as a "celebration of all the years Mika spent dancing around his bedroom as a teenager."

In Other Media 
The song was featured in many TeenNick promos in Fall 2009. It is also used in an ABC series, Make It or Break It.

In Malaysia, it was used for the kids@fgw promo which was shown in January 2010 on ntv7 and in the first episode of the TV show Hellcats.

Track listing 
 UK CD single

 UK digital download

 UK digital EP

 UK 12" single

 UK 7" single

 German 2-track CD single

 German 4-track CD single

 Italian CD single

Charts
The single debuted on the UK Singles Chart at number 4, on 13 September 2009, before dropping out the top ten on its second week, falling to number 11. Despite becoming Mika's second top five single, it was his shortest lasting single, spending only seven weeks in the top one-hundred. The single was released in August in the United States, but failed to make any impact on the charts. In Italy it was a huge success, it peaked at number 3 after 18 weeks on the charts and while his second single from The Boy Who Knew Too Much, "Rain" was still at number 9. It was also certified Gold by the Federazione Industria Musicale Italiana.

Year-end charts

Certifications

Release history

Credits
Mika – vocals, piano, keyboards, background vocals
Greg Wells – keyboards, drums, bass, percussion, programming, guitar
Tim Pierce – guitar
Martin Waugh – additional guitar
Audrey Moukataff – background vocals
Fortune Penniman – background vocals
Paloma Penniman – background vocals
Zuleika Penniman – background vocals
The Andrae Crouch Choir – background vocals

References

2009 singles
Mika (singer) songs
Songs written by Mika (singer)
Music videos directed by Jonas Åkerlund
Song recordings produced by Greg Wells
2009 songs
Casablanca Records singles